Heinz Winkler (17 July 1949 – 28 October 2022) was an Italian-German three-Michelin star chef.

Heinz Winkler was the youngest ever chef to receive three Michelin stars, when, in 1981, he was 32 years old. He also was the first Italian chef to receive three Michelin stars. He specialized in cooking wild game. He received the Federal Cross of Merit in 2001.

Winkler died on 28 October 2022, at the age of 73.

References

External links
 Residenz Heinz Winkler, Aschau
 

1949 births
2022 deaths 
Deaths from multiple organ failure
People from Brixen
Italian chefs
Germanophone Italian people
Recipients of the Cross of the Order of Merit of the Federal Republic of Germany
Head chefs of Michelin starred restaurants